Giles County Courthouse is a historic county courthouse located at Pearisburg, Giles County, Virginia. The central block was built in 1836, and is a two-story, rectangular, brick building in the Federal style.  It was originally "T"-shaped, but flanking wings were added soon after its original construction.  It has a steep, hipped roof with a large octagonal cupola at its apex.  A two-story portico was added about 1900, as was a two-story hyphen and three-story rear addition.

It was listed on the National Register of Historic Places in 1982. It is located in the Pearisburg Historic District.

References

Courthouses on the National Register of Historic Places in Virginia
Government buildings completed in 1836
Federal architecture in Virginia
County courthouses in Virginia
Buildings and structures in Giles County, Virginia
National Register of Historic Places in Giles County, Virginia
Individually listed contributing properties to historic districts on the National Register in Virginia